Sára is a Hungarian and Czech female given name. Notable people with this name include:

 Sándor Sára (1933–2019), Hungarian cinematographer and film director
 Sára Bácskai (born 1999), Hungarian short track speed skater
 Sára Cholnoky (born 1988), Hungarian sailor
 Sára Jahodová, Czech curler
 Sára Kaňkovská (born 1998), Czech racing cyclist
 Sára Kovářová (born 1999), Czech handballer for DHK Baník Most and the Czech national team
 Sára Nysted (born 2001), Faroese swimmer
 Sára Pusztai, Hungarian football player
 Sára Salkaházi (1899–1944), Hungarian nun
 Sára Szenteleki-Ligetkuti (born 1945), Hungarian middle-distance runner
 Sára Tóth (born 1993), Hungarian handball player
 Sára Vybíralová (born 1986), Czech writer

See also
 Sarah (given name)